Ram Narain Agarwal is a noted aerospace engineer of India. He has significantly contributed towards the Agni series of surface-to-surface missiles. and is considered the 'father of the Agni series of missiles'.

He was born to a family of traders in Jaipur, Rajasthan. Agarwal has worked as Program Director (AGNI) and as Director Advanced Systems Laboratory of  the Defence Research and Development Organisation (DRDO).

Awards 
Padma Shri in the year 1990
Padma Bhushan in the year 2000
Dr. Biren Roy Space Science Award (1990) from Aero Society of India
Scientist of the Year Award (1993)
DRDO Technology Leadership Award (1998)
Chandrasekhar Saraswati National Eminence Award for Science (2000)
Life Time Achievement Award (2004).

References 

Scientists from Jaipur
Indian Space Research Organisation people
Defence Research and Development Organisation
Living people
Recipients of the Padma Bhushan in science & engineering
Recipients of the Padma Shri in science & engineering
Rajasthani people
Indian Institute of Science alumni
Indian aerospace engineers
20th-century Indian engineers
Engineers from Rajasthan
Year of birth missing (living people)